Samuel Jones Smith (6 July 1820 – 10 October 1909) was a Baptist missionary of Indo-British birth who became well-known as a printer and publisher in Siam (Thailand). He was adopted in Burma by American missionaries John Taylor Jones and his wife Eliza, before the couple took up a new posting in Bangkok in 1833. Smith was sent to be educated in the United States, and returned to Bangkok as a missionary in 1849. In 1869, he left the mission and established a printing house, publishing several newspapers such as The Siam Weekly Advertiser as well as many popular works of Thai literature.

Notes

References

Further reading

British Baptist missionaries
Baptist missionaries in Thailand
Expatriates in the Rattanakosin Kingdom
British people of Anglo-Indian descent
Burials at the Bangkok Protestant Cemetery
Publishing in Thailand
1820 births
1909 deaths
19th-century Baptists